SKUC Theatre (ŠKUC gledališče) is a member of the Student Cultural Center Ljubljana (ŠKUC).

About ŠKUC organization
ŠKUC is one of the leading non-governmental organisations promoting non-profit cultural and artistic activity in Slovenia. Its beginnings date back to Ljubljana's radical student movement of 1968, though the theatre itself was not formally established until January 31, 1972. In the late 1970s and in the 1980s, ŠKUC was one of the key supporters and promoters of alternative culture. Today, ŠKUC's main goals are to support promising young artists by including them in the cultural sphere and to organise creative spare-time activities for young people. During the past few years, the activities of ŠKUC have expanded to areas such as providing information and counselling for young people, including education, a library, archives, social affairs, prevention, sociology, humanism as well as research activities. It has also acquired the status of an association working in the public interest in the area of health care.

About ŠKUC Theatre
The theatre section took its first steps in the late 1980s with some notable street and ambient performances. The first generation produced some of today's well-recognised theatre actors and groups. The ŠKUC Theatre again came to life in 2000 after a long period of inactivity following a significant start with street theatre. Conceptually, its work focuses on so-called 'chamber performances' with the guiding principle that such theatre involve young, professional artists as well as students of play, production and the dramatic arts. The selection of dramaturgical texts is based on staging world premieres and debut performances in Slovenia, as well as texts dealing with the problems of marginalised groups in society. The annual production comprises three performances of its own production or in co-production with other groups and theatre houses. Art Manager is Alen Jelen.

References
ŠKUC Theatre
ŠKUC

Theatres in Ljubljana
Arts organizations established in 1972